Sir David Bruce Omand  (born 15 April 1947) is a British former senior civil servant who served as the Director of the Government Communications Headquarters (GCHQ) from 1996 to 1997.

Background
Omand was born on 15 April 1947.  His father, Bruce, was a Justice of the Peace. Omand was educated at Glasgow Academy and Corpus Christi College, Cambridge, receiving an economics degree.

Career
Omand began his career at GCHQ. After working for the Ministry of Defence for a number of years, Omand was appointed Director of GCHQ from 1996 to 1997. His next post was Permanent Under-Secretary of State at the Home Office.

Omand was appointed a Knight Commander of the Order of the Bath (KCB) in the 2000 New Year Honours. In 2002 he became the first Permanent Secretary and Security and Intelligence Co-ordinator in the Cabinet Office. Omand was among those who decided that David Kelly should be pursued for talking to the media about the Government's dossier on Iraq's alleged WMD. Omand and Kevin Tebbit, then permanent secretary at the Ministry of Defence, recommended to Jack Straw and Tony Blair that John Scarlett become the new head of the Secret Intelligence Service (MI6).

In 2003 Omand participated in the development of the United Kingdom's general counter-terrorism strategy, CONTEST.

Omand was promoted to Knight Grand Cross of the Order of the Bath (GCB) in the 2004 Birthday Honours. He retired from the Cabinet Office in April 2005.

In 2007, he obtained Maths and Physics degrees from Open University.

In 2009 he was asked by the Home Secretary, Alan Johnson, to carry out a review into the Advisory Council on the Misuse of Drugs to "satisfy ministers" that the council is "discharging the functions" that it is supposed to.

On 20 January 2010, Omand gave evidence to the Iraq Inquiry.

In 2013 he defended the closeness of Britain's intelligence relationship with the US, telling BBC Radio 4's Today programme: "We have the brains. They have the money. It's a collaboration that's worked very well."

Since leaving the government, Omand has landed jobs with several military-related companies. He has been a non-executive director at UK arms company Babcock International and Italian arms company Leonardo-Finmeccanica and has also worked as an adviser to the Society of British Aerospace Companies.

In October 2020, he authored a book titled, How Spies Think: Ten Lessons in Intelligence; a book covering his views on long-term intelligence analysis gained from his experience working with British governments from Margaret Thatcher to Tony Blair.

Links with academia

Omand is currently a visiting professor at King's College London and is a vice-president of the Royal United Services Institute. Omand's second book applies the idea of Just War theory to intelligence.

Omand participated in TEDxLambeth, a conference based in Lambeth, where he spoke about ideas from his book, How Spies Think: Ten Lessons in Intelligence, in October 2020.

Personal life
Omand married Elizabeth Wales in 1971 with whom he has two children. He is a member of the Reform Club. He served a four-year term on the board of the Natural History Museum, London, starting in 2006. He remains a trustee.

References

External links
November 2013 interview with Ormand

Living people
1947 births
Academics of King's College London
Alumni of Corpus Christi College, Cambridge
Civil servants in the Ministry of Defence (United Kingdom)
Directors of the Government Communications Headquarters
Fellows of Corpus Christi College, Cambridge
Knights Grand Cross of the Order of the Bath
People educated at the Glasgow Academy
Permanent Secretaries of the Cabinet Office
Permanent Under-Secretaries of State for the Home Department